RCAF Station Dafoe was a Second World War Royal Canadian Air Force station located near Dafoe, Saskatchewan, Canada. The station was home to the British Commonwealth Air Training Plan's No. 5 Bombing and Gunnery School. The school opened January 1941 and closed January 1945. Aircraft used included the Westland Lysander, Bristol Bolingbroke, Avro Anson, and Fairey Battle.

Aerodrome information
The aerodrome was listed with three runways as follows:

Notable trainees 
William Arthur Sevicke-Jones, NZ429050 LAC Jones W A S, attended from 4 October 1943 to 15 November 1943.

See also 
 List of airports in Saskatchewan
 List of Royal Canadian Air Force stations
 List of defunct airports in Canada

References

 Bruce Forsyth's Canadian Military History Page - No. 5 Bombing & Gunnery School, retrieved: 2014-11-18
 Dafoe Community Directory - Dafoe RCAF Airbase History, retrieved: 2009-12-15
 Vintage Wings of Canada - Ghosts of Saskatchewan, retrieved: 2014-11-18

Canadian Forces bases in Canada (closed)
Dafoe
Military airbases in Saskatchewan
Dafoe
Dafoe
Leroy No. 339, Saskatchewan
Military history of Saskatchewan